Latham Park is a multi-purpose stadium in Newtown, Wales. It is currently used for football matches and is the home ground of Newtown F.C. The stadium holds 5,000 people and is named after former Wales international footballer George Latham.

Over the years the club have played at a number of sites but the officers and general committee of the late 1940s took the decision to purchase and construct a new playing headquarters at a site to be called Latham Park. This decision was a far-sighted one, and the present board officers, committee, supporters and players owe much to their counterparts of some 60 years ago.

The Control Techniques stand has 420 covered seats with dressing rooms for the club and the community use. A further stand has been constructed at the Llanidloes Road "Allotment End" side of the ground and the old "Shed" stand has been improved with new seating as well as new dug out facilities. The function room and social club has also seen a new extension built on to the club house.

During the 2004/05 season the clubhouse was extended with the building of a new function room with a 200 capacity. This coupled with upgrading of the floodlights and a new pitch drainage system resulted in a football ground with social facilities to equal any club in non-league football.

The most recent addition in October 2009 is a new media room with balcony which also acts as an exclusive sponsors lounge on club match days. In early 2004, the club was awarded the UEFA Licence, the first Welsh Premier club to receive this licence.

During the last 11 years, the club have hosted not only their own UEFA cup ties against Skonto Riga (1996) and Wisła Kraków (1998) but a host of other games including U21 Internationals, full ladies Internationals, Champions League and UEFA ties for other Welsh Premier Clubs as well as full U15 and U18 Internationals. The Welsh Cup final has been hosted on two occasions at the ground and the Welsh League Cup final eight times.

The ground is currently sponsored by Paveways and is known as Paveways Latham Park.

In 2014 Newtown became the 2nd Welsh Premier League club, after The New Saints, to change their grass turf for a 3G Artificial Turf.

References

Football venues in Wales
Welsh Cup final venues
Stadiums in Wales
Multi-purpose stadiums in the United Kingdom
Newtown, Powys